Pivot Airlines is a Canadian charter airline. Its air operator certificate allows for the operation of CRJ-100 series aircraft.

Destinations

Fleet
As of October 2022, the DH8A and CRJ2 are currently being incorporated into the fleet and expected to be flying November 2022.

References

External links
 Pivot Airlines

Airlines of Canada
Airlines established in 2020
Charter airlines
Charter airlines of Canada
Companies based in Mississauga
2020 establishments in Ontario
Regional airlines of Ontario